Alaa Eddine Aljem (Arabic: علاء الدين الجم), is a Moroccan director and screenwriter.

Biography 
Aljem is a graduate of the The Superior School of Visual Arts of Marrakech (ESAV Marrakech). He also studied at the Institut National Supérieur des Arts du Spectacle et des Techniques de Diffusion (INSAS) in Brussels for a master's degree in directing, production and screenwriting. After working as a scriptwriter and assistant director for film and television, he founded the production company Le Moindre Geste in Casablanca alongside producer Francesca Duca.

He began his career as a director with three short films. In 2015, he directed the short fiction film Les poissons du désert, which won the Grand Prize for Best Short Film, the critics' award and the screenplay award at the National Film Festival of Morocco.

In 2016, he was chosen by Screen International Magazine as one of the five rising stars of the Arab world.

In May 2019, his first feature film, Le Miracle du Saint Inconnu, a Franco-Moroccan co-production, was screened at the Cannes Film Festival's Critics' Week. The film was nominated for the Caméra d'Or and was also screened at several festivals in Europe, America, Asia and Australia. The film was also well received by critics and the public and was selected to represent Morocco at the Oscars in 2021.

Filmography

Feature films 
 2019: The Unknown Saint

Short films 
 2008: Alaa's Ritual (Le rituel d'Alaa)
 2009: National Education 
 2011: Tribute 
 2013: The Third Hand (Troisième main) 
 2015: The Desert Fish (Les poissons du désert)

References

External links 
 

Morocco articles needing expert attention
Moroccan film directors
Moroccan screenwriters